Mohammad Korban Ali (14 February 1944 – 2 August 2016) was a Jatiya Party (Ershad) politician and the former State Minister. He was the Member of Parliament of Kushtia-1.

Early life, Education and Family
Mohammad Korban Ali was born on 14 February 1944 in Kushtia District. He obtained an MA in Political Science from Dhaka University. He has one son and two daughters. His son's name is Shahriar Jamil and his daughters' names are Farhana Ali and Farzana Ali.

Career
Ali was elected to parliament from Kushtia-1 as a Jatiya Party candidate in 1986 and 1988.

Death 
Mohammad Korban Ali died in 1944-2 August 2016.

References

Jatiya Party politicians
Living people
3rd Jatiya Sangsad members
4th Jatiya Sangsad members
1944 births
University of Dhaka alumni